Kromelmboogspruit (Afrikaans for 'crooked elbow stream') is a tributary of the Vaal River in the Free State, which is part of the Orange River drainage basin. It is found near Heilbron and flows upwards in a north-westerly direction to drain into the Vaal between Parys and Sasolburg.

Ecology and water quality 
In a report from June 2021, SANBI found the Kromelmboogspruit to be in a "moderately modified ecological condition", and thus of high "ecological importance and sensitivity". The Ecosystem Protection Level and Ecosystem Threat Status is considered critical and poorly protected. In 2019 a surface water assessment was completed for Sasol, where Kromelmboogspruit was found to be within the limits set by the Water Use Licence, a mandatory license if a higher usage of water is required.

Fish species found at Kromelmboogspruit

Macroinvertebrate families found at Kromelmboogspruit

See also 

 List of rivers of South Africa

References 

Rivers of the Free State (province)
Free State (province)-related lists